Susan McWilliams Barndt (born January 6, 1977) is an American political theorist. She is the co-editor of the peer-reviewed academic journal American Political Thought and chairs the politics department at Pomona College.

Early life and education
McWilliams was born on January 6, 1977, and grew up in central New Jersey. Her father was political scientist Wilson Carey McWilliams, and her grandfather was political journalist Carey McWilliams. She became interested in politics from a young age. She attended Amherst College and subsequently received her doctorate in politics from Princeton University.

Career
McWilliams began teaching at Pomona College in 2006, having been drawn to the college as a "dream school" by professor John Seery. She is an advocate for the small liberal arts college model of higher education, and co-edited a book with Seery on the topic.

Works

A Political Companion to James Baldwin. Lexington, Kentucky: University of Kentucky Press.  2017. ISBN 9780813169910.
The Best Kind of College: An Insider's Guide to America's Small Liberal Arts Colleges (with John Seery). SUNY Press. 2015. ISBN 9781438457727.

References

External links
Pomona College faculty page
2018 convocation address

American women political scientists
American political scientists
Amherst College alumni
Pomona College faculty
Living people
1977 births
American political philosophers
American women academics
21st-century American women